Niyogi is a caste of Brahmins.

Niyogi may also refer to:
Audrey Stevens Niyogi, American biochemist and co-discoverer of RNA polymerase
Jnananjan Niyogi, social reformer and activist with the Indian Independence Movement
Kanailal Niyogi, activist for the Bengali Language Movement
Partha Niyogi, professor of computer science and statistics at the University of Chicago
Shankar Guha Niyogi, Indian labor activist